The Rt Rev.Samuel Pollinger was the third Bishop of Cariboo.He was born in 1868  and ordained in 1908.  He served first at Quesnel and then Prince George before his elevation to the episcopate.He died in March 1943.

Notes

1868 births
Anglican bishops of Cariboo
20th-century Anglican Church of Canada bishops
1943 deaths